Sea of Cowards is the second studio album by the American alternative rock band the Dead Weather. It was first released on May 7 in Ireland, then on May 11, 2010, in the U.S. and May 10 in the United Kingdom.

The album was streamed on the band's website, via continuous vinyl playback, for a period of 24 hours from April 30 to May 1. It was subsequently available for streaming on various media streaming websites such as National Public Radio and KCRW.  The album was rated number 11 on Rolling Stones list of the 30 Best Albums of 2010.

Background and release

In 2009, the group worked on 15 songs over three days at White's Nashville studio, Third Man Records.  They reconvened at the studio in December, and recorded the album in three weeks.  The vinyl LP version was pressed at United Record Pressing in Nashville, Tennessee.
 
On May 3, before the album's release, the band played a special show at White's Third Man Records where Sea Of Cowards was played in its entirety. The show was streamed on MySpace and subsequently appeared on the band's YouTube channel. The performance was released on 12" vinyl through the Third Man Records' Vault subscription service, recorded live to analog tape and pressed directly to vinyl. This is in contrast to the controversial mastering process of the original album.

Composition

According to Billboard magazine, "the grinding blues that drives tracks like 'Hustle and Cuss' and 'Gasoline' take the Dead Weather to a new level of intensity."  Brisbane periodical mX identified the song as "a grimy road trip through voodoo blues, garage rock and even metal."

Reception

Critical
Sea of Cowards received generally favorable reviews, ratings with Metacritic rating of "70."  Giving the album a B+, Entertainment Weekly said it was "35 minutes of furious guitar solos and demonic howls."  Spin magazine gave the work eight out of ten stars, and said that Mosshart and White "harness this icy alpha-dog tension into a distorted call-and-response aggression that's now greater than its parts, a rudely heavy swath of rock'n'roll authority."  Pitchfork rated Sea of Cowards at 7.8 (out of ten), noting that "it's a heavy, snarly, physical rock album, and it feels like the work of people so secure in their ass-kicking abilities that they don't have to sweat the details."  Blare magazine remarked that the album "combines the group’s sinister attitude with dreary funk and sex appeal."

Commercial
The album debuted on Billboard 200 at No. 5, and  No. 3 on Top Rock Albums.  It has sold 171,000 copies in the US as of September 2015.

Track listing

On CD versions, there is a 36 second instrumental pre-gap track hidden before "Blue Blood Blues".

There are also two additional "bonus" songs pressed on the label of Sea of Cowards vinyl.

Personnel
Alison Mosshart: lead vocals, maracas, rhythm guitar, synthesizer
Jack White: drums, vocals, guitar
Dean Fertita: lead guitar, organ, piano, synthesizer
Jack Lawrence: bass, drums

Appearances in the media
The album's opening song, "Blue Blood Blues", was featured in the final episode of Season Two of the HBO comedy Eastbound & Down in 2010.  The album's song "I Can't Hear You" was featured in the movie Crazy, Stupid, Love and is a playable song in the guitar-themed video game Rocksmith. It also played over the 2019 Giorgio Armani Acqua di Giò Absolu Instinct men’s fragrance ad.

Charts

References

Further reading
Dead Weather Title Second Album 'Sea of Cowards', Emily Tan, spinner.com, Retrieved: 19-03-2010
Dead Weather rising above a Sea of Coward, Fernando Scoczynski Filho, antiquiet.com, Retrieved: 19-03-2010
Album news: The Dead Weather - Sea of Cowards, Ronan Hunt-Murphy, swearimnotpaul.blogspot.com, Retrieved: 19-03-2010

External links

Official website

2010 albums
The Dead Weather albums
Warner Records albums
Albums produced by Jack White
Third Man Records albums